Michael Bowen (born June 21, 1953) is an American actor. He is best known for portraying Nicolas Cage's romantic rival, Tommy, in the cult classic Valley Girl (1983), Danny Pickett on the ABC series Lost, and Jack Welker on the AMC series Breaking Bad.

Early life
Bowen is the only son of Beat painter Michael Bowen Sr. and actress Sonia Sorel (née Henius; 1921–2004) who was Bowen's first wife. His maternal great-grandfather was biochemist Max Henius, a Danish immigrant to America who himself was of Polish-Jewish descent, and his maternal great-grandmother was the sister of historian Johan Ludvig Heiberg. He grew up in San Francisco knowing "interesting characters—revolutionary-type people," which inspired his portrayal of Uncle Jack on the AMC series Breaking Bad. Through his mother's other marriage he is the half-brother of actors Robert and Keith Carradine of the Carradine family. He is the half-uncle of actresses Martha Plimpton and Ever Carradine.

Career
Besides his TV work and his appearance as Tommy in Valley Girl, Bowen has more than 130 film credits to his name as of 2022, including The Godfather Part III (1990), Beverly Hills Cop III (1994), Jackie Brown (1997), Magnolia (1999), Kill Bill Volume 1 (2003), Walking Tall (2004), and Django Unchained (2012). On November 30, 2015, Fox announced he would play Matches Malone on Gotham.
His most recently released film is A Soldier's Revenge, which was released in 2020.

Filmography

Film

Television

References

External links

20th-century American male actors
21st-century American male actors
American male film actors
American male television actors
American people of Danish descent
American people of Polish-Jewish descent
Carradine family
Living people
Male actors from San Francisco
American Ashkenazi Jews
Jewish American male actors
Place of birth missing (living people)
Year of birth missing (living people)